Roseland is an unincorporated community in Nelson County, Virginia, United States.  It was among the communities severely affected by flash flooding from Hurricane Camille in 1969. 

Roseland is home to the Devils Backbone Brewing Company.

Notable people
 Thomas Withers, U.S. Navy Rear Admiral and submariner

References
GNIS reference

Unincorporated communities in Nelson County, Virginia
Unincorporated communities in Virginia